Charles M. Campbell (1918–1986) was an American educator, civil rights activist and politician from Hawaii. Campbell was a member of the Honolulu City Council, Hawaii State Legislature and Hawaii State Senate.

Campbell traveled to Washington, D.C. in 1964 with Rev. Abraham Akaka in favor of the Civil Rights Act of 1964.

References

1918 births
1986 deaths
African-American state legislators in Hawaii
Activists for African-American civil rights
Members of the Hawaii House of Representatives
Hawaii state senators
Honolulu City Council members
Place of birth missing
Educators from Hawaii
20th-century American politicians
African-American city council members
20th-century African-American politicians
African-American men in politics